Le Réveil de Flore (en. The Awakening of Flora), (ru. «Пробуждение Флоры», Probuzhdenie Flory) is a ballet anacréontique in one act, with choreography by Marius Petipa and music by Riccardo Drigo, to a libretto written by Petipa and Lev Ivanov.

History
Marius Petipa and Riccardo Drigo's one-act ballet Le Réveil de Flore was originally created as a piece d'occasion in honor of the wedding of Emperor Alexander III's daughter, the Grand Duchess Xenia, to the Grand Duke Alexander Mikhailovich. Their wedding took place at the Cathedral of Peter and Paul at Peterhof on  before the whole of the Imperial Russian aristocracy, the Imperial court, foreign royalty, and other prominent members of society. Three days later on  the wedding party and guests attended a lavish performance at the newly renovated imperial theatre of Peterhof where Le Réveil de Flore was presented for the first time after the second act of Charles Gounod's Roméo et Juliette. 

This performance took place during a farewell benefit for the ballerina Maria Anderson, who had been forced into early retirement after sustaining burn injuries in a theatre fire.

Le Réveil de Flore was praised by contemporary critics, with the critic of the St. Petersburg Gazette stating that the ballet "...was one of those masterpieces with which Marius Petipa has made a gift to the ballet stage."

Riccardo Drigo's music was also acclaimed and was issued in orchestral partition and piano reduction by the music publisher Zimmerman in 1914.

The choreography for Le Réveil de Flore was erroneously credited as a joint effort between Marius Petipa and the Imperial Ballet's second Maître de ballet Lev Ivanov in the original printed theatre programme. A review in the St. Petersburg Gazette of the first répétition générale of the ballet also credited the choreography to both Petipa and Ivanov. This caused Marius Petipa to write a letter of correction to the newspaper: 

The ballerina Anna Pavlova included an abridged version of Le Réveil de Flore in the repertory of her touring company. Conductor Richard Bonynge recorded Pavlova's abridged edition of Drigo's score for his 1974 LP "Homage to Pavlova" with the London Symphony Orchestra.

2007 Reconstruction
Le Réveil de Flore was given its final performance in 1919. Marius Petipa's choreography for the ballet was documented in the Stepanov method of choreographic notation very soon after its premiere in 1894, being among the first ballets to be recorded in this method. Today this notation is part of the Sergeyev Collection, held in Harvard University Library's theatre collection.

In 2005, the choreographer and historian Sergei Vikharev utilized this choreographic notation to stage a reconstruction of Petipa's original 1894 choreography for Le Réveil de Flore for the Mariinsky Ballet. The production also included a complete restoration of the original décor and costumes. Riccardo Drigo's score was restored from the original hand-written manuscript held in the archives of the Mariinsky Theatre's music library by conductor Pavel Bubelnikov with the assistance of the musicologists Lyudmila Sveshnikova and Elena Belyaeva.

The production was first presented at the Mariinsky Theatre during the VIIth International Ballet Festival on 12 April 2007 at the Mariinsky Theatre, St. Petersburg. The principal dancers were Evgenia Obraztsova as the Goddess Flora, Xenia Ostreikovskaya as the Goddess Aurora, Svetland Ivanova as the Goddess Diana, Vladimir Shklyarov as the God Zephyr, Maxim Chaschegorov as the God Apollo, Valeria Martynyuk as the God Cupid, Alexei Timofeyev as the God Mercury and Daria Sukhorukova as the Goddess Hebe.

Sergei Vikharev commented to the St. Petersburg Times that the ballet was "... like an ornate Fabergé egg."

The production of Le Réveil de Flore was awarded the 2007 Golden Mask award.

Pas de quatre La Roseraie 

Included among the Stepanov choreographic notation of Le Réveil de Flore is a pas de quatre called La Roseraie. It was created by the dancer and teacher Nikolai Legat at some point in the late 1900's as a concert piece featuring characters from the full-length Le Réveil de Flore: the goddesses Diana, Aurora, Hebe and Flora. The pas de quatre was set by Legat to pieces from Riccardo Drigo's score for Le Réveil de Flore as well as pieces he composed for other works.

In 2004, the teacher and choreographer Yuri Burlaka revived the pas de quatre for a student workshop of choreography at the Bolshoi Theatre. The pas de quatre was soon being danced by students and professionals alike throughout Russia, with its variations going on to become quite popular on the international ballet competition circuit.

Roles and original cast

Résumé of dances and scenes 
List of scenes and dances of Le Réveil de Flore taken from the piano score that was published in 1914.
№01 Prélude
№02 L’apparition et danse de Diane–nocturne
№03 L’apparition d’Aquilon
№04 Scène et danse de la rosée–scherzo
№05 L’apparition et scène d’Aurore
№06 Valse de Flore, d’Aurore et des nymphes
№07–a L’apparition d’Apollon
№07–b Entrée et danse de Zéphyr
№07–c Entrée et danse de Cupidon suivi des amours–pizzicato
№08 Pas d’action—
—a. Scène et Pas d'ensemble (cadenza for violin for Leopold Auer)
—b. Variation de Zéphyr
—c. Variation de Flore (cadenza for harp for Albert Zabel)
—d. Grande valse-coda
№09 L’arrivée et scène de Mercure, de Ganymède et d’Hébé
№10 Grande marche–bacchanale
№11 Grand pas
№12 Galop générale
№13 Apothéose: Gloire d’Olympe

Libretto 

Taken from the original published piano score of 1894.

Tableau 1 — It is night. Flora, the goddess of Spring, is deep asleep with her nymphs; Diana, the goddess of Moon, guards their peace. With the approach of dawn, a freshness is felt in the air. Diana hides in the clouds.

Tableau 2 — Aquilon, the northern wind, rushes stormily over the locale; his cold breath of wind awakens Flora and forces her to seek refuge in the foliage. The appearance of chilling dew brings Flora to despair, and she implores Aurora, the goddess of the dawn, to help them.

Tableau 3 — Aurora consoles Flora with tender caresses and announces that Apollo, the god of day, who will end their sufferings, is following behind her. Aurora, Flora, and her nymphs perform a waltz.

Tableau 4 — With the appearance of resplendent Apollo, everything becomes animated. Smitten with the beauty of Flora, Apollo kisses her. At his call, Zephyr, the god of the gentle west wind, flies to his beloved Flora's embrace. He is followed by Cupid and her little amours. "You must be his helpmate," Apollo tells her, "It is the will of the gods." Everyone is delighted; Cupid, amours, and nymphs rejoice over the lover's happiness. A classical Pas d’action is performed.

Tableau 5 — Mercury, messenger of the gods, announces Hebé, the goddess of youth, and Ganymede, cupbearer to the gods. They present Flora and Zephyr a cup of nectar and proclaim that Jupiter has given them eternal youth.

Tableau 6 — A procession. The chariot of Bacchus and Ariadne is accompanied by bacchantes, satyrs, fauns, sylvans, and others. A Grand pas is performed by all assembled, followed by a rousing finale.

Apotheosis — Olympus is revealed; Jupiter appears, Juno, Neptune, Vulcan, Minerva, Ceres, Mars, Pluto, Proserpina, Venus, and others.

Gallery

Footnotes

External links 
Vaganova School: Awakening of Flora/Пробуждение Флоры Pas de quatre

Ballets by Marius Petipa
Ballets by Lev Ivanov
Ballets by Riccardo Drigo
1894 ballet premieres
Ballets premiered at the Peterhof Theatre
Aurora (mythology)
Diana (mythology)
Apollo
Cupid
Mercury (mythology)
Works based on classical mythology